Sheet metal forming in medium-high volume production environments is often completed through the use of a Transfer Press operating a number of dies as a complete system. Each die in the system is responsible for adding more shape to the part until the metal work piece attains its final shape. What makes transfer stamping unique is that a single press operates a number of tools, the movement of the sheet metal work piece from one operation to the next is performed by automation either built into the press or onto the dies. With each closing of the press the entire system of tools will close, each performing its designed work to the sheet metal. Upon opening the built in transfer mechanism moves the workpiece from one operation to the next in the sequence. 

In the past these operations may have been performed using individual presses and the workpieces may have been moved from press to press, and die to die, by hand. As Automation improved hand loading was replaced by pick and place automation and by robots.  The transfer press is a natural extension of this practice, simplifying the operation by having all tools in a single large press and using automation which is specifically designed for the press operations.

Transfer mechanisms

Tri-axis transfer 

Named for the movement of the transfer mechanism, tri-axis transfer mechanisms motion is defined by the three (3) axes of movement made by the part manipulators each press stroke. On the press downstroke the automation which will likely be holding the work piece will lower the work piece to the tool and retract to leave the part on the tool. At the bottom of the stroke the automation mechanism in the retracted state will cycle backward one pitch to position itself adjacent to the next workpiece. As the press cycles upward the part manipulators will index inward to pick up the next work piece, continuing upward following the press ram, then indexing forward to next station. As the press reaches the top of its stroke, the process repeats. The three axes of motion are up-down, in-out, and forward-back.

Cross-bar transfer 

With a cross bar transfer mechanism, the in-out axes of movement is constrained by an automation bar spanning the die space. Commonly mounted with suction cups, this cross bar will pick the workpiece up from above and release the part, dropping it into place at the next station. With only two axes of motion and the automation spanning the die space, the cross bar transfer mechanism must "dwell" between adjacent tools between each press stroke.

References

Presswork
Metal forming